Samarkand State Medical University (Samarkand State Medical Institute until April 1, 2022) is a higher educational institution in Uzbekistan. The University is located in the city of Samarkand.

History   
Samarkand State Medical University was founded in May 1930 on the initiative of the Council of People's Commissars of the Uzbek SSR.

  Rectors of the university from the day of its foundation
Nemcovich Lev Solomonovich (1930—1935)
Nedosekov Yuliy Solomonovich (1935—1942)
Professor Zahidov Hakim Zahidovich (1943—1945) 
Abdullaev Rauf Abdullaevich (1945—1951) Professor, Honored scientist of Uzbekistan
Adilov Aziz Kudratovich (1951—1955) Docent 
Mirzamuhammedov Mannap Atamatovich  (1955—1961)Professor. Leading pediatrician of Uzbekistan, Honored Scientist of Uzbekistan
Haitov Musa Nazarovich (1961—1966 ) Docent, deputy of the Supreme Soviet of the Uzbek SSR, First Secretary of the Samarkand City Committee of the UzSSR
Vahabova Uktam Karimovna (1966—1981 ) Professor, Honored Scientist of the Republic of Uzbekistan, Deputy of the Supreme Soviet of the Uzbek SSR.
Aripov Subhankul Aripovich (1981—1986) Professor, Honored Scientist, and Doctor of the Republic of Uzbekistan.
Kamalov Nuriddin Mirzayevich (1986—1995 ) Docent
Muminov Akram Ibragimovich (1995—2000 ) Professor, Honored Scientist of Republic of Uzbekistan..
Sobirov Bahodir Urdushevich (2000-2004 ) Professor
Shamsiyev Azamat Muhiddinovich (2004–2020) Professor. Member of the New York Academy of Sciences.
Rizayev Jasur Alimdjanovich (from 2020) Professor

Institute during the Second World War 
On the basis of Samarkand State Medical University (SamSMU) in 1942-1944, the evacuated Leningrad Military Medical Academy and the Kuibyshev Military Medical Academy were located.

Structure of the University

Faculties 
There are 10 faculties in SSMU:

 Faculty of Medicine, founded in 1930;
 Faculty of Pediatrics, founded in 1963;
 Faculty of Medical Pedagogy, founded in 2005;
 Nursing faculty founded in 2005;
 Faculty of Dentistry, founded in 2009;
 Faculty of Pharmacy, founded in 2009;
 Faculty of Medical Prophylactics, Public Health and Medical Biology, founded in 2020;
 International Faculty of medical education, founded in 2009;
 Faculty of Postgraduate Professional Training of Physicians, founded in 1981

Since 2020, the Institute has launched 6 joint educational programs 

“Medicine”

“Pediatrics”

“Dentistry”

“Nursing"

"Clinical Psychology "

"Management: Healthcare management "

Departments of Master's and Clinical Residency 
In the departments of magistracy and clinical residency, specialists are trained in the following areas: obstetrics and gynecology; therapy (by directions) - endocrinology, cardiology, neurology, phthisiology, narcology; otorhinolaryngology; ophthalmology; general oncology; surgery (by directions); anesthesiology and resuscitation; traumatology and orthopedics; forensic examination; pediatrics (by directions); pediatric surgery; dentistry (by directions); infectious diseases (by direction); pediatric neurology; functional and instrumental diagnostic methods (medical radiology); urology; neonatology; neurosurgery; dermatovenereology.

Department of Scientific Research, Innovation and Training of Scientific and Pedagogical Personnel 
It is one of the main structural units of the university, which operates in accordance with the charter and organizes its activities on the basis of orders and orders of the rector, as well as the Academic Council of the university. In recent years, the training of scientific and pedagogical personnel at the highest level of the education system has begun to acquire significantly different scales and goals: specialists of the highest scientific qualification today need not only scientific and educational universities, but also the healthcare sector, as well as knowledge-intensive industries that determine the success of the development of an innovative economy. Scientific councils for awarding the academic degree of candidate and doctor of sciences have been created and are effectively functioning at SSMU. In order to increase knowledge among young people in the field of innovative developments, the development of scientific thinking, independent work skills, and the development of creative abilities, the course "Fundamentals of Scientific Research and Innovative Activity", designed for 6 hours of training, has been introduced into the educational process of 4th year students in all areas of education. All conditions have been created for holding competitions for startup projects, an IT incubation center for startup projects has been opened, where favorable conditions will be reflected in the effective operation of small innovative projects, increasing their quality, quantity and implementation of original scientific and technical ideas among talented young people.

Faculty 
In Samarkand State Medical University there are 83 departments, including courses where 624 scientists and teachers conduct scientific and pedagogical activities. Of these, 85 are doctors of science, 265 are candidates of science.

Educational process at the university 
Keeping up with the times, the university staff is sensitive to all the requirements of reforms and transformations that are taking place in the field of education and health care in the Republic of Uzbekistan. Since 2005, a new milestone has begun in the history of the university. To date, decent conditions have been created for a high-quality educational process and scientific activities of the teaching staff in order to significantly increase their return. At the university, in order to ensure a high-quality educational process, as well as conducting research work, lecture halls, classrooms and educational and clinical laboratories are equipped with the latest information basic technologies, multimedia projectors, video and audio systems, distance learning has been introduced. The educational process is supported by modern information and communication Internet technologies using electronic and modular training systems (mt.sammu.uz), where electronic teaching and methodological materials are placed in all disciplines that are taught at the university, including in English for foreign students. Also, the Student Scientific Society (SSS) operates in all departments.

Information and educational resources 
The staff of Samarkand State Medical University, which occupies a leading position among medical universities of the Republic of Uzbekistan, in the new academic year commissioned a modern information and resource center for students. The information and resource center is equipped with new machinery and modern equipment that meets international standards. There is also a modern information kiosk with a sensor. Thanks to this, students, undergraduates and research scientists can easily access the university's website, Telegram channel and other websites, receiving the necessary information. The information and resource center has created conditions for the provision of bibliographic information and information and resource services to users of the scientific, methodological and information department. There is a separate hall for book exhibitions. The training hall is designed for 80 seats. The center's fund is currently filled with more than 300,000 copies of literature. In particular, over the past three years, more than 17 thousand books have been received by the university library. Also in the library there are 9,000 copies of educational literature in the amount of 344 pieces, created by university teachers. The fund of the center also has rare scientific literature in the field of medicine, both domestic and imported from abroad. Every state, every nation in the world is powerful primarily for its intellectual potential and high spirituality. Such an indomitable source of power is first embodied in a book that is a great discovery of the human mind. The relocation of the modern information and resource center of Samarkand State University, which has a 90-year history, to a new building and filling it with new literature will undoubtedly serve to increase the spirituality and scientific potential of young personnel and future doctors.

Clinics of the university 
At SamSMU there is a clinic No. 1, designed for 375 beds, and a clinic No. 2, designed for 200 beds, equipped with the necessary and modern medical equipment. Clinical bases for students are also all medical and diagnostic institutions of the city of Samarkand, where in the future they undergo practical training. According to the resolution of the President of the Republic of Uzbekistan Shavkat Mirziyoyev dated April 1, 2022 "On the establishment of Samarkand State Medical University and further improvement of the system of personnel training in this area", the following were established: Research Institute of Rehabilitation and Sports Medicine, Research Institute of Microbiology, Virology, Infectious and Parasitic Diseases named after L. M. Isaev, Republican Specialized Scientific and Practical  Medical Center for Epidemiology, Microbiology, Infectious and Parasitic Diseases, Specialized Scientific and Practical Center for Neurosurgery and Neurorehabilitation, Scientific Center for Immunology, Allergology and Human Genomics.

International cooperation 
  Samarkand State Medical University takes an active part in the implementation of projects within the framework of grants of the Center for Science and Technology, Fundamental Research of the Academy of the Republic of Uzbekistan, and also closely cooperates with foreign partners. Cooperation is successfully carried out with many international and educational organizations of the USA, Germany, Japan, South Korea, the Netherlands, Spain, Russia, Ukraine, Kazakhstan and Kyrgyzstan. Graduates of SSMU, after graduation, fruitfully work both in Uzbekistan and abroad in the USA, Israel, Germany, Russia. The staff of the university is distinguished by a clear vision of new horizons in the development of medical education and science. Positive changes that have occurred over the years of independence in the oldest medical university have brought it to a number of authoritative educational institutions that occupy a leading place in the educational space of the country's higher education. This gives a powerful impetus to further strengthen the prestige of Samarkand State Medical University in the important business of training highly qualified specialists.

References

Sources
Rector of Samarkand State Medical University
Military-Medical Academy, St. Petersburg. Petrograd. Leningrad: Encyclopedic reference. — М.: Great Russian Encyclopedia. Ed. collegium: Belova L.N., Buldakov G. N., Degtyarev А. Ya. etc. 1992.
Section History, Official website of the Samarkand State Medical University.
Section History Archived 10.24.2015., Official website of the Samarkand State Medical University

External links
Official website of the University

Educational institutions established in 1930
1930 establishments in the Soviet Union
Samarkand State Medical Institute
1930s establishments in Uzbekistan
Universities in Uzbekistan
Buildings and structures in Samarkand
Medical schools in Uzbekistan